Guillermo Rodríguez Melgarejo (20 May 1943 – 4 January 2021) was an Argentine Roman Catholic bishop.

Melgarejo was born in Argentina and was ordained to the priesthood in 1970. He served as titular bishop of Ucres and as auxiliary bishop of the Roman Catholic Archdiocese of Buenos Aires from 1994 to 2003 and as bishop of the Roman Catholic Diocese of San Martín in Argentina from 2003 to 2018.

Notes

1943 births
2021 deaths
20th-century Roman Catholic titular bishops
20th-century Roman Catholic bishops in Argentina
21st-century Roman Catholic bishops in Argentina
Roman Catholic bishops of San Martín in Argentina
Roman Catholic bishops of Buenos Aires